Romain Roussel  (1898 in Le Teil, Ardèche – 1973) was a 20th-century French writer, laureate of the Prix Interallié in 1937.

At the age of seven, he arrived with his parents in Franche-Comté, where he spent all his life. Several of his novels are devoted to his adopted region. He died in 1973.

Some works 
1937: La Vallée sans printemps — Prix Interallié.
1944: L'Herbe d'avril.
1946: La Tête à l'envers.
1947: Dieu est passé la nuit, nouvelles.
1947: Les Chemins des cercles.

Bibliography

External links 
  Romain Roussel, La maison sous la cendre(compte rendu) on Persée
 Interview with Romain Roussel on YouTube (7 December 1965)

20th-century French novelists
Prix Interallié winners
People from Ardèche
1898 births
1973 deaths